The 2019–20 Y-League season (also known as the 2019–20 Foxtel Y-League season for sponsorship reasons) was the twelfth season of the Australian Y-League, the premier national competition for youth football in the country.

Teams
Ten teams competed in the league – the same ten from the previous season – divided into two conferences. The competition ran from 16 November 2019 to 31 January 2020.

Conference A
Conference A contains teams from outside of New South Wales and the Australian Capital Territory.

Conference B
Conference B contains teams from New South Wales and the Australian Capital Territory.

Managerial changes

Tables

Results

Positions by round

Grand Final

Season statistics

Scoring

Top scorers

Hat-tricks

Clean sheets

Discipline

Player

 Most yellow cards: 4
 Aaron Anderson

 Most red cards: 1
 Matthew Bozinovski

Club 

 Most yellow cards: 18
Melbourne City Youth

 Most red cards: 1
Melbourne Victory Youth

See also
2019–20 A-League
2019–20 W-League

References

External links
 Official Y-League Website

2019–20 A-League season
A-League National Youth League seasons
2019 in Australian soccer
2020 in Australian soccer